The Dial Award was presented annually by the Dial Corporation to the male and female American high-school athlete/scholar of the year.

Awardees

See also 
Wendy's High School Heisman

References 

 Sports Illustrated 1999 Sports Almanac, Little, Brown, and Co., Boston, 1998.

American sports trophies and awards
High school sports in the United States
Awards established in 1979
Awards disestablished in 1998